Roger Pfund (born 1943) is a Swiss graphic artist.

In 1970–1971, Pfund won the currency design contest, hosted by the Swiss National Bank, for the design of a new series of bank notes. However another design was printed.

He is also credited with the creation of the last version of the French franc, as well as a series of the Euro, and the 2003 Swiss passport.

References

 Roger Pfund. Tome III, Orell Füssli Verlag AG, 2006.

External links 
 Tome III, Arbeiten von 1999 - 2006
 http://www.rogerpfund.ch/
 http://www.atelierpfund.ch/

Living people
Currency designers
1943 births
Swiss artists